Associazione Calcio Monza is a professional football club that is based in Monza, Lombardy, Italy. The team plays in the Serie A, the first tier of Italian football, following promotion in the 2021–22 Serie B season.

The club was founded in 1912 as Monza F.B.C. and on multiple occasions in the 1970s came close to promotion to the Serie A. At times during the first two decades of the 21st century, they faced financial issues; they were declared bankrupt twice, in 2004 and 2015. Following Silvio Berlusconi's 2018 takeover of the club, Monza returned to the Serie B in 2020 after a 19-year absence and reached promotion to Serie A for the first time in 2022. Before their promotion, no Italian team had played more Serie B seasons (40) without playing in the Serie A. Monza have won the Coppa Italia Serie C a record four times, the Serie C championship four times, and an Anglo-Italian Cup.

From the club's founding Monza's colours were blue and white, but were changed to red and white in 1932; as a result, the team are nicknamed  (the white and reds). Monza have played their home games at the Stadio Brianteo since 1988. The team have rivalries with Como, Pro Sesto and Pisa.

History

Foundation and first tournaments (1912–1927)

Monza Foot-Ball Club was founded on 1 September 1912 in the Cappello Vecchio , following the merger of the Monza-based clubs Pro Italia and Pro Monza. The new club established their first headquarters in the Roma coffeehouse located on the similarly named town square in Monza; the team initially wore a blue and white kit. Monza's first recorded game was against a team from Milan, while their first win came on 20 September 1912 when they beat  2–1 in Triante. The club won their first trophy, the Coppa Colli, in early 1913 after beating  3–2 in the final.

In November 1913, Monza F.B.C. merged with Juventus F.B.C. (a group of athletes formerly part of the  sports club) to form Associazione Calcio Monza. The , Monza took part in the Promozione (second level), finishing fourth in their group of six. Despite the outbreak of World War I, when conscription forced teams to send their adult players to war, Monza were able to continue their sporting activity with young players.

Between 1915 and 1918, the war interrupted official tournaments. Having finished first in their group, Monza played the promotion finals against , losing 2–1. The Italian Football Federation, however, decided to promote Monza via repechage, and the team were allocated to the Prima Categoria, the top tier of Italian football. In 1919, Monza hosted the Czechoslovakia military national team for a friendly game at Grazie Vecchie field that ended in a 1–1 draw.

Monza were grouped with Milan, Cremonese and Pro Patria in their qualifying group for the Prima Categoria. Their first game was played on 24 October 1920, a 4–1 home defeat to Milan; Francesco Mandelli scored Monza's lone goal. They finished the 1920–21 season with no points and in last place in their group. The following season, Monza finished second in their group, missing out on the final stage by one position. Due to a restructuring of the league system, Monza were moved to the Seconda Divisione (second level) for the 1922–23 season; they avoided relegation by beating Chiasso and Canottieri Lecco in the play-offs. In 1926–27, after beating Ponziana 3–2 in the final, Monza were declared champions of the Seconda Divisione Lega Nord (third level) and were promoted to the Prima Divisione (second level).

and Serie B promotion (1932–1953)

During the 1930s and 1940s Monza played in the Prima Divisione (third level), which became the Serie C in 1935. In September 1932, ahead of the 1932–33 season, Monza changed their shirt colours to red and white, which they have worn ever since. They became nicknamed "" (the white and reds) following the colour change. Monza finished in first place the following season and played a round-robin tournament with three other teams for promotion to the Serie B (second level); they finished fourth and failed to move up to the second level. On 23 April 1939, the club reached the Coppa Italia quarter-finals, losing 2–1 to Serie A side Genoa. They became the first Serie C team to reach the quarter-finals of the competition.

Between 1942 and 1945, World War II interrupted football in Italy. Following the war, Monza were placed in the Serie C (third level), finishing eighth in the 1945–46 season. They came close to promotion the following season, finishing third in the promotion play-offs. In 1947, Peppino Borghi became president of Monza. Monza, who were coached by Annibale Frossi, headed into the 1950–51 Serie C with a strong transfer campaign.

Monza debuted in the Serie B on 9 September 1951, drawing to Siracusa 1–1 away from home. The team only avoided relegation on the last matchday with a 2–1 home win against Piombino. Against most experts' pre-season expectations, Monza finished the 1952–53 Serie B in fourth position, three points behind automatic promotion in second place.

Simmenthal merger and aftermath (1955–1967)
In July 1955, ahead of the 1955–56 season, Monza merged with Prima Divisione (sixth level) side G.S. Simmenthal, the football club of the  food company. A.C. Monza was renamed A.C. Simmenthal-Monza, and was headed by Simmenthal owner Claudio Sada. The merger helped fund subsequent transfer campaigns. The match between Monza and Verona on 8 October 1955 was the first free-to-air televised match in Italy. Monza's first season under the new management was positive, finishing the season in third place. In the following years, until the end of their merger in 1964, Monza alternated positive seasons (fourth and fifth place in 1958 and 1961, respectively) with negative ones (16th and 15th in 1960 and 1964). On 14 July 1964, Simmenthal ceased to sponsor Monza and the club reverted to its former name.

Despite Monza's stable financial situation, no one was interested in purchasing the club; Sada decided to remain president for the following season. While Monza barely avoided relegation in the 1964–65 season, the same could not be said about the next season: following 15 years of second-tier football, Monza were relegated to the Serie C in the last matchday of the season, drawing 0–0 away to Mantova on 19 June 1966.

Serie A promotion attempts (1969–1979)

Three years after their Serie B promotion, Monza came close to reaching the Serie A for the first time in the 1969–70 Serie B under coach Luigi Radice; they needed an away win against first-placed Varese to keep their promotion chances alive on the second-to-last matchday. On 7 June 1970, after just two minutes of play, Monza took the lead through ; in the sixth minute,  failed to double the lead, wasting a clear chance in front of the goal. Varese won 2–1, preventing Monza from gaining promotion.

In mid-1972, Giovanni Cappelletti became president of the club. In his first year in charge, Monza were relegated to the Serie C after losing the last match of the 1972–73 season away to Bari 3–1. Despite their relegation, Monza saw success in the Coppa Italia Semiprofessionisti, reaching the finals in 1974, 1975 and 1976, winning the first two over Lecce and Sorrento, and losing the third in a repeat of the first final. Five matches before the end of the 1975–76 season, Monza were promoted back to the Serie B; they also won an Anglo-Italian Cup on 19 June 1976, beating Wimbledon 1–0 in the final through a  goal.

During the late 1970s, Monza came close to gaining promotion to the Serie A on multiple occasions. The first time was as a newly promoted team in the 1976–77 season, when they lost the season's final match 2–1 against Modena through an 81st-minute own goal. The following season went in a similar fashion for Monza, losing out to direct promotion in the second-to-last matchday against Pistoiese. In the 1978–79 Serie B season Monza again missed out on promotion in the final matches, being defeated by already-relegated Lecce in the second-to-last match. Monza tied with Pescara on points for third place and the two sides played a promotion tie-breaker, which Monza lost 2–0. In Cappelletti's last season as president, in 1979–80, Monza failed to gain promotion to the top flight for the fourth consecutive year. Four games from the end of the season, Monza were in third place in a spot for direct promotion; decisive defeats against Cesena and Brescia meant that Monza finished in fifth place, three points from Serie A promotion.

Valentino Giambelli presidency (1980–1999)

Valentino Giambelli became the club president in 1980, succeeding Cappelletti, and the club was renamed Calcio Monza. In the 1980–81 Serie B, Monza played in a championship with historical sides Milan and Lazio; both of whom had been relegated from the Serie A following the 1980 Totonero scandal. Monza finished in last place and were relegated to the Serie C1 (third level), but were promoted back . They remained in the Serie B for a further four seasons before being relegated in 1986.

The second leg, which was played on 11 June 1988, was Monza's last game in the Stadio Gino Alfonso Sada, after which the team moved to the newly constructed Stadio Brianteo. The first match was played at the new stadium on 28 August 1988, when over 10,000 spectators attended Monza's Coppa Italia game against Serie A club Roma; against expectations, Monza won 2–1 with goals by Casiraghi and Carmelo Mancuso.

After having closely avoided relegation in 1988–89 on goal difference, Monza lost the 1989–90 Serie B relegation play-off against Messina on 7 June 1990, and were relegated to the Serie C1. On 13 June 1991, Monza won a record fourth Coppa Italia Serie C, beating Palermo in the final. They gained promotion to the Serie B in the  but two years later, Monza finished the 1993–94 season in last place and returned to the third tier.

In June 1997, Monza returned to the Serie B after defeating Carpi 3–2 in the promotion play-off final; they were coached by Luigi Radice, who had also helped them to promotion 30 years prior. The following season, newly promoted Monza changed most of their roster, introducing young players, many of whom came from Milan's youth sector. The team closed the season having been on the verge of relegation.

Financial instability (1999–2018)

In April 1999, after 19 years of presidency, Giambelli left the club amid criticism from fans concerning Monza's close connection with Milan and their CEO Adriano Galliani. With Giambelli's departure, Monza ceased to be Milan's satellite team. The club entered a period of instability, changing owners twice in five years. Monza were relegated to the Serie C1 in 2001 and then, for the first time, to the Serie C2 (fourth level) in 2002.

On 18 March 2004, Monza was declared bankrupt. On 3 June the same year, the club was acquired by Atalanta vice-president Gian Battista Begnini, who renamed it A.C. Monza Brianza 1912. Monza twice came close to promotion to the Serie B, losing two consecutive play-off finals. In the 2005–06 season, after having lost at home 2–0, Monza won the away leg to Genoa 1–0, having missed many chances to score further goals. The 2006–07 season was even more dramatic: in the first leg at home, Monza beat Pisa thanks to a 74th-minute penalty. In the second leg, a first-half goal by Pisa forced the game into extra time, and Pisa scored again to secure promotion at Monza's expense.

On 13 July 2009, Begnini sold the club to the PaSport holding company, headed by former Milan player Clarence Seedorf. The new ownership did not last long: in 2012 the club was relegated to the Serie C2 and, on 12 May 2013, was sold to Anthony Armstrong Emery. Following broken promises regarding an increase in finances in the club, Monza was sold again, on 12 December 2014, to Dennis Bingham for €1. The new president was contested straight away by fans for not paying the players' salaries.

Following the club's sale to Piero Montaquila in March 2015, Monza won the 2014–15 Lega Pro relegation play-offs against Pordenone, and were due to remain in the third level the following season. However, Monza were declared bankrupt on 27 May. The club was acquired by Nicola Colombo on 2 July that year and was renamed S.S.D. Monza 1912. Monza registered to the Serie D (fourth level) on 31 July and finished the 2015–16 season mid-table. In May 2016, the club changed its name to S.S. Monza 1912 and achieved promotion back to the Serie C under coach Marco Zaffaroni in 2017.

Berlusconi presidency and Serie A promotion (2018–present)

On 28 September 2018, the holding company Fininvest, which was headed by former Milan president Silvio Berlusconi, announced its acquisition of Monza; Monza-born Adriano Galliani, formerly CEO of Milan, also became part of the board of directors. The Berlusconi–Galliani duo had been one of the most successful leaderships in football history, having won 29 trophies with Milan between 1986 and 2016. According to Forbess 2021 ranking, Berlusconi was the richest owner of a football club in Italy, and ninth worldwide, with his fortune being valued at $7.6 billion.

In the first season under the new leadership, Monza finished the 2018–19 Serie C in fifth place with Cristian Brocchi as coach, and lost to Viterbese in the final minute of the Coppa Italia Serie C final. On 1 July 2019, the club returned to its historical name A.C. Monza. Aiming for direct promotion to the Serie B, Monza reinforced their squad with players with Serie A experience to prepare for the 2019–20 season. In March 2020, Monza held first position with a 16 point-lead over second-placed Carrarese. The same month, the Lega Pro committee announced the suspension of the league due to the COVID-19 pandemic. On 8 June, the Italian Football Federation formally declared Monza champions and the team were promoted to the Serie B after a 19-year absence from the competition.

Monza headed into the 2020–21 Serie B as the club most likely to finish in first place, according to most bookmakers. Having finished the first half of the season in second place, in a spot for direct promotion, Monza dropped one position at the end of the season and took part in the promotion play-offs; they lost to Cittadella 3–2 on aggregate in the semi-finals. Brocchi was dismissed at the end of the season, and was replaced by Giovanni Stroppa as head coach.

In the 2021–22 season, Monza lost to Perugia and missed out on direct Serie A promotion in the last matchday. Having finished in fourth place, Monza played the play-off semi-finals where they defeated Brescia and reached the final against Pisa. Monza won the first leg at home 2–1, while Pisa won the second leg 3–2. Two goals in extra time by Monza won them the encounter 4–3 (6–4 on aggregate), to earn promotion to the 2022–23 Serie A for the first time. Prior to their promotion, Monza had competed in 40 Serie B seasons, the most of any Italian club without ever being promoted to the first division. Christian Gytkjær was key to helping Monza to promotion, scoring five goals in the playoffs.

Monza began their Serie A season on 13 August 2022, with a 2–1 home defeat to Torino; Dany Mota's goal in stoppage time was Monza's first in the Italian top flight. After consecutive defeats in the opening five games, Monza earned their first point in a 1–1 draw to Lecce on 11 September. Sitting in last place with only one point in six games, Monza replaced Stroppa with under-19s head coach Raffaele Palladino. He guided them to their first historic win on 18 September, in an upset 1–0 win against giants Juventus at home thanks to a goal by Gytkjær.

Colours and identity

Colours
Upon their formation in September 1912, Monza's team wore long-sleeved, blue shirts with a white collar and cuffs. The choice of blue was "forced"; a local cloth dealer, who was a football fan, gave the newly founded club a piece of blue cloth he had not been able to sell for years. Following World War I, in the 1919–20 Promozione, the countless washes faded the shirts' colours from blue to white, and they were replaced with new, half-white and half-blue shirts with matching sleeves.

The club continued to wear the blue-and-white colours for 20 years until September 1932, when Monza changed their colours to red and white, which they have worn ever since. The kit was a white shirt with a red vertical stripe in the middle and black shorts. The team's away kit was the inverse of the home one; on occasions when Monza were to face a team also wearing red and white, they wore a blue kit. Ever since, the home kit has been red and the away kit white; prior to 1971, the home shirt was generally solid red and the away shirt white. In the 1937–38 and 1961–62 seasons, Monza's home shirt was striped red-and-white.

During the 1950s, the shorts were usually white and rarely black. Goalkeepers wore black or grey kits. In 1971, Monza's home kit underwent a slight but significant change: a vertical white band was added on the left-hand side, running through the length of the red shirt. The band was red for the white away shirt. The following year, the vertical band extended to the shorts and the kit numbers were displayed on the sleeves. The  (Iron Crown) was used as a logo at the top of the stripe on the chest. In the seasons following Monza's Coppa Italia Serie C wins in 1974, 1975, 1988 and 1991, the cockade of Italy replaced the crown. On 22 August 1979, during a 1979–80 Coppa Italia game against Milan, Monza displayed the players' names on top of the numbers on the back, a novelty at the time dubbed "" (American style); the Italian Football Federation did not approve of the change and fined the club. Monza first displayed a sponsor on their shirt in 1982, showing the text "".

From 1981, the lateral white stripe was removed from the kit, making way for different forms of full-red shirts; the stripe returned sporadically for short periods in 1992, 2000, 2014 and since 2018. In 2019, following the club's name change back to A.C. Monza, new Lotto shirts that included a small  logo on the back of the collar in reference to the Monza Circuit were unveiled. On their 110th anniversary on 1 September 2022, Monza introduced a light blue kit as their third colours for the 2022–23 season in honour of the club's first shirt.

Badge

Monza's first crest was designed in 1920: it depicted a blue shield with a red border, with a golden  inside. The text "A.C. Monza" was written in black inside a white horizontal band on top of the shield. The crest remained in use until 1932, when Monza's colours changed to red and white. In 1933, the badge became circular and was vertically divided into red and white halves, and included golden initials A.C.M. with the crown at the bottom. During the 1937–38 season, the badge's shape was changed from a circle to an oval, keeping the same details. It stayed the same until 1945, following World War II, when it changed to a rectangular shape that was divided into red and white halves. The white half on the left featured the club's name and the founding year, while the crown was placed in the red half.

Following Monza's promotion to the Serie B in 1951, the crest again became oval shaped and the text's orientation was changed from vertical to horizontal. This design lasted five years until Monza's merger with Simmenthal, when the logo became more detailed; the badge was shaped like an ox head, including the horns. The colours were placed diagonally, similarly to the 1951 crest, with the letters S (for Simmenthal) and M (Monza) being placed on top of each other in the badge's centre. The crown was placed above the letters. After the end of the merger in 1966, the badge became a stylised golden  with red details. The epigraph of the club's name was placed in the inner circle. In 1984, Monza's logo went back to a rectangular shape. A white inverted chevron was placed inside, with the words "Calcio" and "Monza" placed on each side of the chevron. A vertical sword, a reference to Estorre Visconti, was placed inside the downwards-pointing triangle formed by the chevron. The crown formed the hilt of the sword.

In 2000, the logo changed to a rounded-bottom shield; a red crown was placed in the top third on a white background, while the bottom two-thirds contained the words "Calcio Monza 1912" written in white on a red background. The logo remained until 2004, when a new crest was introduced: it was a more rounded red shield with white details; "AC Monza Brianza" was written on top, and a depiction of a sword "cutting through" a crown – both drawn in a minimalist style – was placed on the bottom. Monza celebrated their 100th anniversary in the 2012–13 season. A modified version of the logo was announced to mark the occasion: a gold crown with red and white gems was placed on top of the crest. "MB" (standing for Monza Brianza) written in red was placed below the crest, surrounded by "2012" to the left, "1912" to the right and "100" on the bottom, all written in gold.

Starting from the 2013–14 season, Monza's logo included a red shield with the club's name ("AC Monza Brianza") in white capital letters inside. The  was placed above the shield and two white "Visconti" crossed swords were included inside the shield. The logo underwent a minor redesign in 2015, when the two crossed swords were replaced with a vertical sword, and the text on top changed to "S.S.D. Monza", to reflect the club's name change. In 2016 and 2019, the text in the badge was changed to "Monza" and "AC Monza", respectively. In 2021, a thin red outline was added to the logo, enclosing the already present white border surrounding the red shield. The same year, Monza published a brand manual, including information about the geometrical construction of the badge, the fonts used by the club, and their colour dubbed "" (Monza Red; hex: #E4032E).

Anthem
Since 2006, the club's official anthem has been the song "Monza Alè", which was written and composed by the band Amusia, whose leader was former Monza player Michele Magrin.

Stadiums

First grounds

Pro Monza and Pro Italia, the clubs that merged to form Monza in 1912, played in the Boschetti Reali in front of the Royal Villa of Monza. After the merger, Monza first played in the district of Triante; the field was called "" (outside the door) because it was located outside the city of Monza. Small stands were built for a cost of ITL3,000 (€12,000 as of 2022). The opening match at the field was played between Milan and Chiasso on 13 May 1912, which ended in a 5–2 win for Milan.

Monza's first city-based stadium was the Grazie Vecchie, which was inaugurated on 13 May 1915 with a 1–0 win over Juventus Italia. The stadium also played host to a friendly match between Monza and the Czechoslovakia military national team in 1919, which ended in a 1–1 draw.

The stadium was inaugurated in early 1924 with a friendly against Gloria from the city of Fiume, following the city's recent annexation to Italy, which Monza won 2–1. The  field continued operating until 1939 when World War II made it impractical.

Stadio Gino Alfonso Sada

In 1945, following the war, a new playing field was built on the parade ground of the former  (GIL), and was called the San Gregorio field. It was inaugurated on 21 October with Monza's 2–0 friendly win over Pavia. Following Monza's promotion to the Serie B in 1951, a grandstand and stands were built, and the stadium was renamed Stadio Città di Monza; the supporters, however, continued using its traditional name.

In 1965, the stadium was renamed Stadio Gino Alfonso Sada in honour of the deceased former president of Monza. The club's last match at the "Sada" was played on 11 June 1988; it was the away match of the 1987–88 Coppa Italia Serie C final against Palermo, which Monza won 2–1.

Stadio Brianteo

On 28 May 1979, plans for the construction of a new stadium, which were approved by the Extraordinary Commissioner Alfio Licandro, began. Construction of the new Stadio Brianteo began on 13 November 1982 and ended in 1986. In the initial project, the stadium's capacity was expected to be around 30,000; for security reasons, however, the capacity was lowered to just under 20,000. Monza played their first game at the "Brianteo" on 28 August 1988, when they hosted Serie A side Roma in the Coppa Italia; Monza won their first match in their new stadium 2–1.

On 4 September 2020, the stadium was renamed U-Power Stadium, following a sponsorship deal with footwear and workwear company U-Power. Monza re-opened the east stand – which had been closed for 20 years – ahead of the 2022–23 Serie A season, bringing the maximum seating capacity from 10,000 to about 16,000.

Monza inaugurated their training ground, on 3 November 1986. It was renamed "" on 8 October 2022, in honour of owner Silvio Berlusconi and honorary president Paolo Berlusconi's late father.

Supporters

The first signs of organised support emerged in the early-1970s with the founding of the ultras groups Commandos in 1971 and Club Ultras Monza in 1972. Eagles Monza emerged in the early 1980s. After Monza's move to the new Stadio Brianteo in 1988, several ultras groups began to fold; Eagles was abandoned in 1992. In 1994, Sempre Al Bar (S.A.B.) was formed.

Following Berlusconi's takeover of the club in 2018, attendance figures started to rise and new supporter groups began to emerge. On 31 March 2022, Monza formed the A.C. Monza Club, a project that is aimed at uniting official Monza fan clubs by organising meetings, rallies and sporting events.

The  of the Brianteo is also called "" in memory of a young fan who died in 1998. The press stand – part of the west stand – was named in memory of Claudio Parma, a journalist and  fan who died in 2008, while the entire west stand bears the name of the historic fan Angelo Scotti, who died in 2018.

Rivalries

Monza's main rivalry is with fellow Lombardy club Como; it has been defined as the "hottest derby in Serie B". The two clubs first played each other in Como on 19 November 1922, with the match ending in a goalless draw. The rivalry began on 4 June 1967, when Monza beat Como 1–0 in the decisive promotion play-off match of the Serie B. It became more intense on 13 April 1980; with Monza leading 3–1, Como equalised in the last minute with a penalty. The 3–3 draw ended Monza's chances of promotion to the Serie A.

Another important rivalry is the one with Pro Sesto, which is based in the adjacent city Sesto San Giovanni. Historically, the two sides have had a tradition of beating the other away from home. Monza also have a more recent rivalry with Pisa; in 2007, the two sides played in the Serie C promotion play-off final. Pisa won in extra time, and opposing supporters began attacking each other. In 2022, the two sides met once again in a decisive promotion play-off final, this time for the Serie A: Monza won in extra time, and reached the first division for the first time in their history.

In the media
During the 1955–56 Serie B, Monza's first season after their merger with Simmenthal, Monza's San Gregorio stadium hosted the first free-to-air televised football match in Italy. The match was broadcast by RAI and commentated upon by Nicolò Carosio, and was played on 8 October 1955 between Monza and Verona. The match ended in a goalless draw. Monza earned ITL700,000 (€11,000) from the broadcast. Only 1,500 spectators attended the game because most fans were watching it on television in local bars.

Italian actor Renato Pozzetto, in the 1979 film The Finzi Detective Agency, played a private investigator Riccardo Finzi, a supporter of Monza who said: "" (I support Monza, we will never be able to reach the Serie A). The line became a part of local culture and was used in a fan chant: "" (Our Calcio Monza is in the [Serie] C1, and we will never go to the Serie A. But I will not give up, this is my mentality. You too follow the team of your city).

Esports

In September 2019, Monza launched their esports team to compete in FIFA games. They reached the 2021 FIFA eClub World Cup Europe semi-finals and were ranked 12th in the overall rankings. In January 2022, Monza were awarded the "OIES Badge" by the Osservatorio Italiano Esports.

Players

First-team squad

Youth sector

Out on loan

Club officials

Management

Technical staff

Managerial history

The following is a list of Monza managers throughout history.

 Technical committee (1912–1927)
  Cesare Lovati (1928–1929)
  Ettore Reynaudi (1929–1930)
 Technical committee (1930–1935)
  Leopoldo Conti (1935–1936)
   (1936–1937)
   (1937–1938)
  Leopoldo Conti (1938–1939)
  Alessandro Scarioni (1939–1940)
   (1940–1942)
   (1942–1943)
   (1945–1947)
   (1947–1948)
  Oreste Barale (1948–1949)
  Annibale Frossi (1949–1953)
   (1953–1954)
  Carlo Alberto Quario (1954–1955)
  Pietro Rava (1955–1956)
  Eraldo Monzeglio (1956)
  Bruno Arcari (1956–1958)
  Pietro Rava (1958–1959)
   (1959)
   (1959–1960)
   (1960–1964)
   (1964–1965)
   (1965–1966)
   (1966)
  Luigi Radice (1966–1968)
   (1968)
  Nils Liedholm (1968–1969)
  Luigi Radice (1969–1971)
   (1971–1973)
  Gino Pivatelli (1973)
  Mario David (1973–1975)
   (1975–1980)
  Sergio Carpanesi (1980)
  Lamberto Giorgis (1980–1981)
   (1981–1982)
   (1982–1983)
   (1983–1986)
   (1986)
   (1986–1987)
  Pierluigi Frosio (1987–1990)
  Franco Varrella (1990–1991)
   (1991–1993)
  Nedo Sonetti (1993–1994)
  Simone Boldini (1994–1996)
  Giorgio Rumignani (1996–1997)
  Luigi Radice (1997)
  Bruno Bolchi (1997–1998)
  Pierluigi Frosio (1998–2000)
  Roberto Antonelli (2000–2001)
   (2001)
  Simone Boldini (2001)
   (2001)
  Roberto Antonelli (2001–2002)
   (2002)
  Simone Boldini (2002)
  Oscar Piantoni (2002–2003)
  Massimo Pedrazzini (2003–2004)
   (2004–2005)
   (2005)
  Giuliano Sonzogni (2005–2007)
   (2007–2008)
  Dario Marcolin (2008)
  Giuliano Sonzogni (2008–2009)
   (2009–2010)
  Alessio De Petrillo (2010)
  Corrado Verdelli (2010–2011)
   (2011–2012)
  Antonino Asta (2012–2014)
  Fulvio Pea (2014–2015)
   (2015–2016)
  Sandro Salvioni (2016)
   (2016)
  Marco Zaffaroni (2016–2018)
  Cristian Brocchi (2018–2021)
  Giovanni Stroppa (2021–2022)
  Raffaele Palladino (2022–present)

Hall of Fame
The following is a list of players and head coaches who are part of the Hall of Fame on the club's official website. All entries are players unless noted otherwise.

  Francesco Antonioli (1986–1988)
  Evaristo Beccalossi (1985–1986)
   (1975–1977)
  Marco Branca (2000–2001)
  Ruben Buriani (1974–1977)
  Pierluigi Casiraghi (1985–1989)
  Luciano Castellini (1965–1970)
  Alessandro Costacurta (1986–1987)
  Walter De Vecchi (1975–1978)
  Luigi Di Biagio (1989–1992)
  Patrice Evra (1999–2000)
  Maurizio Ganz (1988–1989)
  Jean-François Gillet (1999–2000)
  Nils Liedholm (1968–1969)
  Daniele Massaro (1978–1981)
  Paolo Monelli (1978–1981)
  Emiliano Mondonico (1970–1971)
  Giulio Nuciari (1988–1989)
  Davide Pinato (1983–1988)
   (1977–1978)
  Luigi Radice (1969–1970)
  Anselmo Robbiati (1987–1993, 2004–2005)
  Fulvio Saini (1980–1998)
  Claudio Sala (1965–1967)
  Patrizio Sala (1973–1975)
  Giovanni Stroppa (1987–1989)
  Giuliano Terraneo (1974–1977)
  Marco Zaffaroni (2004–2008)

Honours

The following is a list of honours and achievements Monza have attained throughout their history.

League
 Serie C (Level 3)
 Winners (4): 1950–51 (Group A), 1966–67 (Group A), 1975–76 (Group A), 2019–20 (Group A)
 Seconda Divisione (Level 3)
 Winners (1): 1926–27
 Serie D (Level 4)
 Winners (1): 2016–17 (Group B)

Cup
 Coppa Italia Serie C
 Scudetto Serie D
 Winners (1): 2016–17

International
 Anglo-Italian Cup
 Winners (1): 1976

Other achievements
 Serie B (Level 2)
 Play-off winners (1): 2021–22
 Serie C (Level 3)
 Runners-up (5): 1947–48 (Group F), 1974–75 (Group A),  (Group A),  (Group A),  (Group A)
 Play-off winners (1):  (Group A)
 Prima Divisione Lombardia (Level 4)
 Runners-up (1):  (Group C)
 Coppa Italia Serie C
 Anglo-Italian Semiprofessional Cup
 Runners-up (1): 1975

Notes

References

Bibliography

Further reading

External links

  
 Profile at Lega Serie A 

 
Football clubs in Lombardy
Sport in Monza
Association football clubs established in 1912
Association football clubs established in 2004
Association football clubs established in 2015
Italian football First Division clubs
Serie A clubs
Serie B clubs
Serie C clubs
Serie D clubs
1912 establishments in Italy
Coppa Italia Serie C winning clubs